Joe Hargreaves was an English professional footballer who played for Bradford City between 1912 and 1924, making 188 league appearances. He also played for Clayton YMCA, Great Harwood and Accrington Stanley.

References

Year of death missing
English footballers
Bradford City A.F.C. players
English Football League players
Year of birth missing
Association football wing halves
Great Harwood F.C. players
Accrington Stanley F.C. (1891) players